Friedrich Wilhelm Franz Meyer (1856–1934) was a German mathematician and one of the main editors of the Encyclopädie der Mathematischen Wissenschaften.

Life and work 
Meyer studied in the universities of Leipzig and Munich. In 1878, he was awarded a doctorate by Munich. He studied further in Berlin under Weierstrass, Kummer and Kronecker. In 1880, he got the venia legendi at the University of Tübingen. In 1888, he became a full professor at the Bergakademie of Clausthal (today Clausthal University of Technology). From October 1897 until October 1924, when he retired, he taught at the University of Königsberg.

The wide research work of Meyer (more than 130 papers) is centred basically on geometry and, specifically, on invariant theory.

Notwithstanding he is mainly known for he was one of the main editors of the Encyklopädie der mathematischen Wissenschaften published from 1898 to 1933 in 23 separate books. Meyer was directly in charge to edit the geometry volumes.

References

Bibliography

External links 

 
 

19th-century German mathematicians
20th-century German mathematicians
1856 births
1934 deaths
Academic staff of the Clausthal University of Technology
Scientists from Magdeburg
Leipzig University alumni
Ludwig Maximilian University of Munich alumni
Academic staff of the University of Königsberg
Academic staff of the University of Tübingen